The 1844 United States presidential election in Ohio took place between November 1 and December 4, 1844, as part of the 1844 United States presidential election. Voters chose 23 representatives, or electors to the Electoral College, who voted for President and Vice President.

Ohio voted for the Whig candidate, Henry Clay, over Democratic candidate James K. Polk. Clay won Ohio by a narrow margin of 1.94%.

Results

See also
 United States presidential elections in Ohio

References

Ohio
1844
1844 Ohio elections